Jolanda Mens (born 4 February 1978) is a Dutch former professional tennis player.

Mens, a right-handed player from Leiden, spent most time of her career on the ITF Circuit. She won two ITF singles titles, including one at a $25k tournament in Campos do Jordão. As a doubles player, she claimed 14 ITF titles and featured in the main draw of three WTA Tour tournaments, in Den Bosch, Waikoloa (Hawaii) and Québec in 2002.

ITF Circuit finals

Singles: 5 (2 titles, 3 runner-ups)

Doubles: 36 (14 titles, 22 runner-ups)

References

External links
 
 

1978 births
Living people
Dutch female tennis players
Sportspeople from Leiden
20th-century Dutch women
21st-century Dutch women